In Greek mythology, Pronomus or Pronomos (Ancient Greek: Πρόνομος means 'grazing forward') may refer to two characters:

 Pronomos, the "intelligent" satyr herald of Dionysus during the Indian War. In secret union, Hermes fathered him, Pherespondus and Lycus to Iphthime, daughter of Dorus. Eiraphiotes (i.e. Dionysus) entrusted to these three satyr brothers the dignity of the staff of the heavenly herald which their father was the source of wisdom.
 Pronomus, from Zacynthos, one of the suitors of Penelope along with other 43 wooers. Upon returning from Ithaca, Odysseus shot down all the suitors including Pronomus with the help of Eumaeus, Philoetius, and Telemachus.

Notes

References 

 Apollodorus, The Library with an English Translation by Sir James George Frazer, F.B.A., F.R.S. in 2 Volumes, Cambridge, MA, Harvard University Press; London, William Heinemann Ltd. 1921. ISBN 0-674-99135-4. Online version at the Perseus Digital Library. Greek text available from the same website.
Nonnus of Panopolis, Dionysiaca translated by William Henry Denham Rouse (1863-1950), from the Loeb Classical Library, Cambridge, MA, Harvard University Press, 1940. Online version at the Topos Text Project.
 Nonnus of Panopolis, Dionysiaca. 3 Vols. W.H.D. Rouse. Cambridge, MA., Harvard University Press; London, William Heinemann, Ltd. 1940-1942. Greek text available at the Perseus Digital Library.

Satyrs
Suitors of Penelope
Dionysus in mythology